O.K. Ken? is the second studio album by the blues band, Chicken Shack, released in February 1969. O.K Ken? reached number 9 in the UK Albums Chart, three places higher than its predecessor, 40 Blue Fingers, Freshly Packed and Ready to Serve.

This album was Christine Perfect's last album as a member of Chicken Shack.

Background
Their second LP, O.K. Ken? was released in February 1969 and also garnered chart success just like the prior album 40 Blue Fingers.... While it did surpass the first album by reaching No. 9 on the British charts, unlike the initial LP, it quickly dropped out of the charts due to the lack of an album single to support it. The band then decided to release a song from the first album, "When The Train Comes Back” (BH 57-3146), after overdubbing a horn section over the original track. The flipside of the single was “Hey Baby”, an outtake of the O.K. Ken? album sessions. Christine Perfect composed and provided piano and lead vocals on both single tracks but the single release was only mildly successful.

Stan Webb wrote four of the songs on the album and co-wrote two others with Christine Perfect.  Webb sang all of his compositions and Perfect sang on the Perfect/Webb collaboration, "Get Like You Use to Be". Webb and Perfect sang a duet on the other Perfect/Webb collaboration, "A Woman Is The Blues". Additionally, Perfect sang on covers, "I Wanna See My Baby" and "Mean Old World". The "Pony Trap" and "Remington Ride" are both intrumentals.

The entire album and the rest of the Chicken Shack sessions on Blue Horizon were made available on the CD compilation Chicken Shack - The Complete Blue Horizon Sessions (2007).

Track listing

Side one
"Baby's Got Me Crying" (Stan Webb) – 2:25
"The Right Way Is My Way" (Webb) – 2:00
"Get Like You Used to Be" (Christine Perfect, Webb) – 3:05
"Pony and Trap" (Webb) – 3:00
"Tell Me" (Chester Burnette) – 4:40
"A Woman Is the Blues" (Perfect, Webb) – 2:50

Side two
"I Wanna See My Baby" (Aaron Walker) – 3:30
"Remington Ride" (Herb Remington, Hank Penny) – 2:50
"Fishing in Your River" (Webb) – 4:30
"Mean Old World" (Walter Jacobs) – 3:15
"Sweet Sixteen" (Riley King, J. Josea) – 6:20

Personnel

Chicken Shack
Stan Webb – guitar, vocals
Christine Perfect – keyboards, vocals
Andy Sylvester – bass guitar
Dave Bidwell – drums

Additional personnel
Roderick Lee – trumpet
Terry Noonan – trumpet
Steve Gregory – tenor saxophone
Buddy Beadle – alto and baritone saxophones
Johnny Almond – tenor saxophone
Don Fey – tenor saxophone
Walter Horton – harmonica

Production
Producer – Mike Vernon
Engineer – Mike Ross
Studio – CBS
Photography and design – Terence Ibbott

References

1969 albums
Chicken Shack albums
Albums produced by Mike Vernon (record producer)
Blue Horizon Records albums